Balavadze is a Georgian family name from the Imereti region in western Georgia.

The Balavadze family name comes from these towns of Imereti: Terjola, Kontuati, Kutiri and Ganiri.

References

Georgian-language surnames